Sam's Town Hotel and Gambling Hall is located in Tunica Resorts, Mississippi. Officially known as a riverboat casino because the gaming area is situated on a building built on barges that float in a pool of water linked to the nearby Mississippi River as required by state law, the resort in all other aspects resembles its Nevada sibling, except for the atrium. It includes a 1,600 seat showroom, a 1,070-room hotel, and an RV park.

History
The facility was opened on May 25, 1994, by Boyd Gaming as the third casino branded as Sam's Town and the first casino opened by Boyd outside of Nevada.

In 2002, Boyd bought an adjacent hotel and theater owned by Isle of Capri Casinos for $7.5 million. Sam's Town expanded into the property, adding an additional hotel tower and parking garage. , Sam's Town has over 700 hotel rooms in Tunica.

From 1999 to 2007, Boyd sponsored the Sam's Town 250, a NASCAR Busch Series race at nearby Memphis International Raceway.

During the COVID-19 pandemic in 2020, the hotel and casino were closed from March until May, along with multiple other hotels and casinos in the area.

Notes

References

External links

Boyd Gaming
Casinos in Tunica County, Mississippi
Hotels in Mississippi